Chip Deffaa is an American author, playwright, jazz historian, songwriter, director, and producer of plays and recordings.  For 18 years, he wrote for the  New York Post, covering jazz, cabaret, and theater.  He has contributed to Jazz Times, The Mississippi Rag, Down Beat, Cabaret Scenes, England's Crescendo, and Entertainment Weekly.  He was born in New Rochelle, New York.

Career
Deffaa wrote and directed George M. Cohan Tonight! off-Broadway in New York at the Irish Repertory Theatre. The cast album was released in 2006 by Sh-K-Boom/Ghostlight Records. George M. Cohan Tonight! opened September 21, 2010 at the New Players Theater on the West End in London/ Deffaa directed a production of George M. Cohan Tonight! starring Jon Peterson—star of the original Off-Broadway production—in Seoul, Korea in July 2016.

After several regional productions, One Night with Fanny Brice was produced Off-Broadway in New York at St. Luke's Theatre, 308 W. 46th Street; previews began on March 16, 2011; the official opening night was April 3, 2011. A revised version of the show opened at The 13th Street Repertory Theatre, 50. W. 13th St., NYC, on April 22, 2013. The cast album of One Night with Fanny Brice was released in September 2010 by Original Cast Records.

In 2002 he produced The Chip Deffaa Invitational Theater Festival, taking over two theaters on 42nd Street in NYC to present, with support from Chashama, more than 25 theatrical productions in a six-week period, featuring Jon Peterson, Laurence O'Keefe, Brett Kristofferson, Peter-Michael Marino, Okey Chenoweth, Celia Keenan-Bolger, Dawne Swearingen, Karen Oberlin, Deb Rabbai.

Deffaa also lectures on theater and jazz. His 2007 lectures in Korea, timed to coincide with the opening of one of his plays there, were sponsored by the US State Department. Deffaa has written liner notes for albums by Chase Baird, Count Basie, Ray Brown, Ruth Brown, Miles Davis, Benny Goodman, Scott Hamilton, Dick Hyman, Jon-Erik Kellso, Tito Puente, Randy Sandke, Diane Schuur, Maxine Sullivan, and Frank Vignola.

He is a member of the Stage Directors & Choreographers Society, the Dramatists Guild, ASCAP, NARAS, the Jazz Journalists Association, the F. Scott Fitzgerald Society, the Drama Desk, the American Theatre Critics Association, and is a trustee of the Princeton Tiger magazine.

Deffaa won an ASCAP Foundation Deems Taylor/Virgil Thompson Award in 1993, a New Jersey Press Association Award, and an IRNE Award (Independent Reviewers of New England).

 
 "Chip Deffaa: Musical Archeologist Digs Irving Berlin and Others" by Rob Lester, Cabaret Scenes magazine, March–April 2017

Books
 Swing Legacy 
 Voices of the Jazz Age 
 In the Mainstream 
 Traditionalists and Revivalists in Jazz 
 Jazz Veterans 
 Blue Rhythms 
 C'mon Get Happy with David Cassidy 
 F. Scott Fitzgerald: The Princeton Years (as editor) 

As contributor
 Harlem Speaks 
 Roaring at One Hundred

Plays
 George M. Cohan & Co. (Eldridge Plays)
 George M. Cohan: In his Own Words  (Samuel French)
 Irving Berlin's America (Steele Spring Stage Rights)
 Irving Berlin: In Person (Leicester Bay Theatricals)
 Mad About the Boy
 One Night with Fanny Brice (Leicester Bay Theatricals)
 Presenting Fanny Brice: The Original Funny Girl (Eldridge Plays)
 Song-and-Dance Kids (Leicester Bay Theatricals)
 The Family that Sings Together... (Drama Source)
 The George M. Cohan Revue (Samuel French)
 The Irving Berlin Ragtime Revue
 The Johnny Mercer Jamboree
 The Seven Little Foys (Leicester Bay Theatricals)
 Theater Boys
 Yankee Doodle Boy  (Drama Source)

Discography
 Chip Deffaa's Gay Love (Garret Mountain)
 Chip Deffaa's Irving Berlin & Co.: The Original Cast Album (Garret Mountain)
 Chip Deffaa's Irving Berlin Ragtime Rarities (Garret Mountain)
 Chip Deffaa's Irving Berlin Ragtime Revue: The Original Cast Album (Garret Mountain)
 Chip Deffaa's Irving Berlin Rediscovered: Rare Songs of Love and Longing (Garret Mountain)
 Chip Deffaa's Irving Berlin Revisited: Rare Songs of Love, Loss, and Revenge (Garret Mountain)
 Chip Deffaa's Irving Berlin Songbook: Rare and Unrecorded Songs (Garret Mountain)
 Chip Deffaa's Irving Berlin's America Co-Starring Michael Townsend Wright and Matthew Nardozzi (Garret Mountain)
 Chip Deffaa's Irving Berlin's America: The Premiere Recording Co-Starring Michael Townsend Wright and Jack Saleeby
 Chip Deffaa's Irving Berlin: In Person the Premiere Recording (Garret Mountain)
 Chip Deffaa's Mad About the Boy: The Festival Cast Plus Special Guest Stars (Garret Mountain)
 Chip Deffaa's Mad About the Boy: The Original Cast Album: The 13th Street Theater Production (Garret Mountain)
 Chip Deffaa's One Night with Fanny Brice Starring Mary Cantoni Johnson: The New York Cast Album (Garret Mountain)
 Chip Deffaa's The Seven Little Foys: The Original Cast Album
 Chip Deffaa's Theater Boys: The Original Cast Album 
 George M. Cohan: In His Own Words: Highlights from the Musical Production (42nd Street)
 George M. Cohan: Rare Original Recordings (Chip Deffaa Productions)
 Irving Berlin's America: The Original New York Production with Michael Townsend Wright and Giuseppe Bausillio 
 One Night with Fanny Brice: The Premiere Recording Starring Kimberly Faye Greenberg Original Cast
 The Chip Deffaa Songbook (Garret Mountain)
 The George M. Cohan Revue (Uptown Studio)
 The Johnny Mercer Jamboree: The Original Cast Album

References

Living people
Year of birth missing (living people)
20th-century American dramatists and playwrights
20th-century American male writers
20th-century American non-fiction writers
American male dramatists and playwrights
American male journalists
American music historians
American male non-fiction writers
New York Post people
Historians from New York (state)